Francesca Alotta (born 1 January 1969) is an Italian pop singer, best known for the song "Non amarmi".

Background 
Born in Palermo, Alotta started her career in 1988, as a member of the female group Compilations. She started her solo career in 1991, winning the Cantagiro with the song "Chiamata urgente". 

In 1992, Alotta won the "Newcomers" section of the Sanremo Music Festival with the song "Non amarmi", a duet with Aleandro Baldi, which later became an international hit with the title "No Me Ames". In 1993 she returned to Sanremo Festival, this time entering the "Big Artists" section, with the song "Un anno di noi". The same year, she was cast in the Rai 1 show Domenica in.  In 1997 she entered the music festival "Viva Napoli". In 2004 Alotta was cast in the Rai 2 reality show Music Farm.

Discography 
Album 
 1992 -  Francesca Alotta 
 1993 - Io e te
 1997 - Buonanotte alla luna

References

External links 
Francesca Alotta at Discogs

 
 

1968 births
Italian women singers
Living people
Musicians from Palermo
Italian pop singers
Sanremo Music Festival winners of the newcomers section